The Luxembourg national rugby union team is a minor team, and is ranked as a third tier nation. The team participates in the annual Rugby Europe Championship Conference 2 North 2017–18 Rugby Europe Conference. Since 1996 Luxembourg also competes in the sevens circuits in Europe Luxembourg national rugby sevens team.

Luxembourg has been a member of FIRA since 1976, two years after the founding of Luxembourg Rugby Federation (French: Fédération Luxembourgeoise de Rugby (FLR)). The Grand Duchy has participated several times in the FIRA championships and, despite the small size, has honourably acquitted itself. Luxembourg has also been a member of the International Rugby Board since 1991.

The Luxembourg rugby team is the only national sports team to have been three times champions of their group in a European competition. In 1995, more than 20 points scored against Slovenia at Cessange and more than 20 points scored in Split against Croatia and finally an excellent draw against Andorra in Luxembourg enabled them to be champions of their group. In 1997 they won the Bronze Cup with wins against Bosnia, Bulgaria and Monaco. Luxembourg has in their past encounter recorded a 10–10 draw against Georgia, but the best performance to date was a "Grand Slam" in 2004 in FIRA-AER European Cup division 3B. In the 2017–2018 campaign, Luxembourg won the Grand Slam against Denmark, Norway, Finland and Estonia in the Rugby Europe Conference 2 North, while also integrating several young players in the squad, and gained promotion to the Rugby Europe Conference 1 North for the 2018–2019 campaign.

After two narrow losses to group favourites Ukraine and Sweden, Luxembourg beat Moldova 23–10 at home to, for the first time ever, secure a spot for a second consecutive year on this level. Two weeks later Luxembourg also beat Hungary away 18–15, showing the potential of the team.

The national side is ranked 62nd in the world (as of 04 April 2022).

National clubs
The Rugby Club Luxembourg was founded in May 1973 by a group of expatriates working in the Grand Duchy. Several of the founders still live in Luxembourg and contribute one way or another to the sport. The club played its first competitive game against US Castillionnaise in September 1973. Up until 1995, the club played in the Alsace-Lorraine regional league. In that year, the team joined the Belgian second division, which it belonged to until 1998, when it earned promotion to the first division. In 2001, the club decided to return to the French league system, again playing regionally in Alsace-Lorraine. It won its division in 2008 but, after an invitation to play in Germany, decided to join the German league system in 2009. In the 2017–2018 season, RCL is leading Bundesliga 2 West unbeaten and hopes to secure promotion to Bundesliga 1 for the 2018–2019 season.

De Rugby Club Walferdange was founded in 1990. In 2001, after 10 years in the Belgian League they finished top of the third division and champion during the 2002/03 season. In its first season in the second division, the club was relegated to 3rd Division. The club's objective having gone through a rebuilding phase, is to return to and remain in the Belgian 2nd division.

The Richard Mertens Club is a member of the European Community sports clubs (French: Cercle Sportif des Communautés Européennes) and concentrates on U-7/U-19, its goal being to promote the game of rugby in Luxembourg and act as a feeder club for the two senior clubs of Luxembourg with any talented players. Player retention remains a concern for Luxembourgish rugby with most of such players stopping the sport after school for various reasons, even if they remain in Luxembourg. Despite this, the school has had some success stories since its inception with a few of its past players having gone on to play for well known university and club sides, or having gone on to represent Luxembourg at the senior level.

In 2017, a fourth club was founded in the south of the country in Dudelange, Rugby Club Terres Rouge. The club exclusively caters for the youth; it has been implied by the founders that there is potential for founding a senior team.

A fifth club, the Rugby Eagles Luxembourg, was founded in 2019 and became an official Member of the Luxembourg Rugby Union in June 2020. This club is exclusively a child-centered rugby project.

Statistics XV

Test Record
World Rugby Ranking 56th, highest 56th (4NOV19), lowest 94th (1DEC08)
 Scrum.com

Longest winning streak
10 (14 Apr to 16 May)

Match Record XV

Career XV
View more additional detail Player Statistics

Current Season XV

Current squad XV
See also Player Statistics

Anton Agassi

See also

 Luxembourg Rugby Federation
 Rugby union in Luxembourg
 Luxembourg women's national rugby union team
 Luxembourg national rugby sevens team
 List of Luxembourg national rugby union players
 List of international rugby union families
 List of rugby union players by country

Clubs
 Rugby Club Luxembourg
 Rugby Club Walferdange

References

External links 
Rugby Europe – Current Season Fixtures, Results and Table
Luxembourg rugby union stats from ESPN –  scrum.com

European national rugby union teams
Rugby union in Luxembourg
National team
Rugby union
Teams in European Nations Cup (rugby union)